Perth is an unincorporated community in Blue Earth County, in the U.S. state of Minnesota.

History
Perth was originally called Iceland. A post office called Iceland was in operation from 1867 until 1871. The present name of Perth, after Perth, Scotland, was adopted in 1905.

References

Unincorporated communities in Blue Earth County, Minnesota
Unincorporated communities in Minnesota